The Beier variable-ratio gear or Beier variator is a mechanical drive offering a continuously variable gear ratio between input and output. 

The gear relies on the inter-meshing of a number of thin disks. By varying their separation, the effective radius of one disk varies, thus changing the overall gear ratio. This varying-radius principle is shared by a number of other variator mechanisms. An advantage of the Beier is that a large number of disks may be stacked on a common shaft, thus increasing  its torque capacity for only a small increase in overall length.

The mechanism consists of a spring-loaded stack of thin disks on a central shaft. Around this are arranged other stacked disk packs on a number of planetary shafts, usually three. These shafts are mounted on swinging arms, so that they may be moved in and out together. The central disks are thin, with a thickened rim. The planet disks are tapered across their radius, at an included angle of around 3°. When the disks are intermeshed, they thus only contact at the rim of the central pack, no matter what the spacing of the shafts. These planetary disk packs have a gear meshing with a gear on the swing arms' fulcrum shafts, which in turn meshes with a central gear, used for the input drive. The central shaft is the output shaft and the gear is used as a reduction gear. When the disks are moved outwards, the central rim drives on the outside radius of the similar-sized tapered disks and the overall ratio is around 1:1. As the swing arms are moved inwards, the tapered disks are forced between the central rims against their spring-loading. The effective radius of the tapered disks is thus reduced and the gear ratio increases. The gear is made in a variety of ratio ranges, typically from 3:1 to 10:1. Overall efficiency is good, greater than 90%.

Unlike most other variators, but in common with the Hele-Shaw clutch, the Beier gear does not rely on friction between the disks, but rather on viscous drag through a thin oil film between them. This has little slip, less than 1%, and the lack of friction reduces the losses through heat and thus permits a small compact mechanism to still handle a high power. Oil is often pumped through the drive, also having a cooling effect.

Applications 

The drive was developed by Dr Beier, an Austrian working in Germany.  Some of its first applications were as an automatic transmission in buses.

In 1951, it was used in the E.145 Napier Nomad aero engine. This was a complex turbo-compound engine that coupled a diesel piston engine together with a gas turbine and axial-compressor supercharger. Supercharging boost control was achieved by varying the ratio of this drive. 

In contemporary use, the Beier variator is most widely used as part of an industrial motor drive. An electric induction motor is driven at its ideal speed, derived from the electrical line frequency, and the variator drive is used to manually adjust its output speed. These are often coupled with a cycloidal drive to provide an extra-low speed output.

See also 
 Hele-Shaw clutch

References 

Variators
Mechanical devices using viscosity